Greenlawn  is a station on the Port Jefferson Branch of the Long Island Rail Road near the intersection of Boulevard Avenue and Broadway (Suffolk CR 86) in Greenlawn, New York, a few blocks north of Pulaski Road. It is the first station east of Huntington on the non-electrified section of the branch.

History

In the span of a decade, it was changed to Greenlawn-Centerport and then finally Greenlawn to reflect the new community that had developed around the railroad station.

The first depot was built in 1868 by the Hicksville and Cold Spring Branch Railroad, renamed "Greenlawn" in 1870, burned down on September 29, 1910, and was replaced by the current building in September 1911. The station building was painted with green trim (reflecting the station locale) in the 1990s, after having been painted light blue for several decades. The station had a ticket agent until 1996. In 2017, the station building received a new asphalt roof.

A team track for off-line customers of the New York & Atlantic Railway exists just west of the station. It is sporadically used. The platform on the south side of the station is not used. The switches for the siding are hand-operated, not remotely controlled by DIVIDE Tower in Hicksville, thus making it impractical for everyday LIRR use. The siding is mostly used by work trains and, on rare occasions, by NYA freight trains.

High-level platforms and a pedestrian bridge were added at Greenlawn Station in 1985. These renovations were made in anticipation of planned electrification of the branch from Huntington to Port Jefferson, which has yet to occur.

Station layout
The station has two high-level side platforms. The north platform, next to the main track, is 12 cars long. The south platform, next to the siding, is eight cars long, and is not in use. There is also a pedestrian bridge connecting the two platforms. On either ends of the station, the two tracks merge into one.

References

External links

March 1999 Photo (Unofficial LIRR History Website)
 Station from Broadway from Google Maps Street View

Long Island Rail Road stations in Suffolk County, New York
Railway stations in the United States opened in 1868
Huntington, New York